The name Ida has been used for a total of nineteen tropical cyclones worldwide: three in the Atlantic Ocean, thirteen in the Western Pacific Ocean, one in the Southwest Indian Ocean and two in the Southwestern Pacific Ocean.

Atlantic Ocean:

Ida replaced the name Isabel following the 2003 season. 

 Hurricane Ida (2009) – a strong Category 2 hurricane that made landfall in Nicaragua at Category 1 strength, and then again later at Dauphin Island, Alabama, as a extratropical storm.
 Tropical Storm Ida (2015) – a weak but long-lived tropical storm that moved erratically across the open ocean, never posing a threat to land.
 Hurricane Ida (2021) – made landfall in Cuba, then rapidly intensified into a powerful Category 4 hurricane prior to making landfall in Louisiana with  winds; subsequently caused widespread damage across much of the Eastern United States.

The name Ida was retired in the North Atlantic after the 2021 season, and was replaced by Imani for the 2027 season.

Western Pacific: 
 Typhoon Ida (1945) – struck Japan, also known as Makurazaki Typhoon (ja).
 Typhoon Ida (1950) (T5020, T5022, T5023)
 Typhoon Ida (1954) (T5408)
 Typhoon Ida (1958) (T5822) – struck Japan, also known as Kanogawa Typhoon.
 Typhoon Ida (1961) (T6111, 32W) – struck Japan.
 Typhoon Ida (1964) (T6412, 15W, Seniang) – struck northeastern Luzon and southeastern China near Hong Kong.
 Typhoon Ida (1966) (T6626, 27W) – struck Japan.
 Typhoon Ida (1969) (T6915, 19W)
 Typhoon Ida (1972) (T7221, 22W)
 Typhoon Ida (1975) (T7519, 22W)
 Tropical Storm Ida (1980) (T8007, 08W, Lusing)
 Typhoon Ida (1983) (T8313, 14W, Oniang)
 Tropical Storm Ida (1986) (T8624, 21W, Uding)

South-West Indian Ocean:
 Tropical Storm Ida (1968) – affected Réunion and Mauritius.

Australian region:
 Cyclone Ida (1972) – near Solomon Islands causing $70 million damage.

Southwest Pacific Ocean:
 Cyclone Ida (1971) – in Coral Sea, never threatened land.

See also 

 Cyclone Ita (2014) – a similar name that was used in the Australian region
 Cyclone Idai (2019) – a similar name that was used in the South-West Indian Ocean

Atlantic hurricane set index articles
Pacific typhoon set index articles
South-West Indian Ocean cyclone set index articles
Australian region cyclone set index articles